There's Always a Thursday is a 1957 British crime film directed by Charles Saunders and starring Charles Victor, Jill Ireland, Lloyd Lamble and Robert Raglan. Much of the film was shot at Southall Studios.

Premise
Comedy about a down-trodden clerk's newfound fame as the director of a racy lingerie firm, after an innocent encounter with a fast woman is misreported and earns him the reputation of a suburban Romeo.

Cast
 Charles Victor as George Potter
 Frances Day as Vera Clandon
 Marjorie Rhodes as Marjorie Potter
 Bruce Seton as James Pelly
 Robert Raglan as Crosby
 Jill Ireland as Jennifer Potter
 Richard Thorp as Dennis Potter
 Lloyd Lamble as Detective Sergeant Bolton
 Patrick Holt as Middleton
 Ewen Solon as Inspector Bradley
 Alex Macintosh as TV Interviewer
 Reginald Hearne as Bannister
 Deidre Mayne as Miss Morton
 Glen Alyn as Mrs. Middleton
 Alexander Field as Tramp
 Martin Boddey as Sergeant

Critical reception
TV Guide wrote that a "good performance by Victor and an intelligent script lift this one above the ranks." The film historians Steve Chibnall and Brian McFarlane agree: "The film is quite neatly structured but, without the coherence which Victor's sympathetic understanding of the central character gives, it would seem much thinner than it does. Its comedy centres on the drabness of an oppressive domestic situation and, in the flowering of George Potter, what may be lost in unthinking conformity to a routine."

References

External links 
 

British crime films
1957 films
1957 crime films
Films directed by Charles Saunders
Films shot at Southall Studios
1950s English-language films
1950s British films